Don Manuel Rodriguez de Albuerne y Pérez de Tagle, 5th Marquis of Altamira (1733–1791) was a Spanish-Mexican aristocrat. He was a member of the House of Tagle, one of Spain and Mexico's most important and influential noble family during the 16th to the 19th century.

Early life 
He was born on April 5, 1733 in Guadalajara, New Spain and was baptized on 12 April 1733. Don Manuel was the son of Don Juan Rodríguez de Albuerne and Doña Luisa Pérez de Tagle, 4th Marchioness of Altamira.

Don Manuel inherited the Hacienda Cuisillos after a period of administration by his brother-in-law and legal guardian Domingo Trespalacios Escandón, a judge in the Audiencia of Mexico and a member of the Council of Indies.

Family 
He married Doña María de la Paz Girón Moctezuma, a direct descendant of Emperor Moctezuma II, and a member of the family of the Duke of Moctezuma de Tultengo on April 21, 1771 in Madrid, Spain.

Together they had three children:
 Doña María de la Paz Rodríguez Albuerne y Girón who married her second cousin José María Trespalacios Rodríguez de Albuerne, son of Domingo Trespalacios Escandón and Cecilia Rodríguez de Albuerne y Pérez de Tagle
 Doña Luisa Rodríguez Albuerne y Girón who married Manuel José Álvarez de Abreú
 Don Manuel Rodríguez Albuerne y Girón

Don Manuel and his wife were also the fourth cousins of Empress Ana Maria of Mexico as Don Manuel's and Empress Ana Maria's great great great grandfathers, Don Luis Sánchez de Tagle, 1st Marquis of Altamira and Don Pedro Sánchez de Tagle were brothers.

He is also the great grandfather of Carlos O'Donnell, 2nd Duke of Tetuan and Grandee of Spain through his daughter Doña Luisa.

The title of Marquis of Altamira has since been passed on to the descendants of his great grandson. The current holder of the title is Don Carlos O'Donnell, 15th Marquis of Altamira and Grandee of Spain

References
 Tagle. Enigma de un nombre, Historia de un pueblo. Author: José Luis Sáiz Fernández
 Nobleza Colonial de Chile. Author: J. Mujica
 Diccionario Heráldico y Genealógico de Apellidos Españoles. Author: Alberto y Arturo García Garrafa
 Nobiliario de los reinos y Señorios de España. Author: Francisco Piferrer
 La Sociedad Chilena del siglo XVIII, Mayorazgos y Títulos de Castilla. Author: Domingo Amunátegui Solar
 Patrons, Partisans, and Palace intrigues: the court society of Colonial Mexico. Author: Christoph Rosenmüller
 Hacienda and market in eighteenth-century Mexico: Second Edition, The Rural Economy of the Guadalajara. Author: Eric Van Young and John H. Coatsworth

External links
 http://gw5.geneanet.org/index.php3?b=sanchiz&lang=es;p=luisa;n=perez+de+tagle+sanchez+de+tagle
 http://gw1.geneanet.org/index.php3?b=fracarbo&lang=en;p=jose+bernardo;n=de+tagle+bracho+y+perez+de+la+riva
 https://web.archive.org/web/20090220114504/http://per-can.com/CarpD/deTagle/deTagle.htm#Biografia
 http://www.ianchadwick.com/tequila/16-17th%20centuries.htm

Marquesses of Altamira
1733 births
1791 deaths